The Wizard of Loneliness is a 1966 book written by John Nichols. It's about a boy's experiences on the home front during World War II. It was turned into a 1988 film of the same name.

Synopsis: In World War II, young Wendall Oler is sent to live with his father's family in Vermont. Using this opportunity to act out his resentment for the death of his mother, he does all he can to tyrannize them. But as he grows on his aunt, he begins to feel increasingly at home.

References

1966 American novels
American novels adapted into films
Novels set in Vermont